Pragmatodes is a genus of moths in the family Gelechiidae.

Species

References

Litini
Moth genera